Welsh Calvinistic Methodist Church, also known as , is a historic Calvinistic Methodist church on Prospect Street in Remsen, Oneida County, New York.  It was built in 1831 and is a vernacular stone meeting house building.  It is a simple two story, rectangular building with a gable roof. It is known locally as the Stone Meeting House, and is home to the Remsen Steuben Historical Society.

It was listed on the National Register of Historic Places in 1988.

References

Methodist churches in New York (state)
Churches on the National Register of Historic Places in New York (state)
Churches completed in 1831
Churches in Oneida County, New York
National Register of Historic Places in Oneida County, New York
Welsh-American culture in New York (state)